The Monroe Township Public Schools is a comprehensive public school district serving the educational needs of students in pre-kindergarten through twelfth grade from Monroe Township, in Gloucester County, New Jersey, United States. Services are also provided for preschool handicapped students as well as other students with special needs.

As of the 2019–20 school year, the district, comprised of six schools, had an enrollment of 5,736 students and 449.2 classroom teachers (on an FTE basis), for a student–teacher ratio of 12.8:1.

The district is classified by the New Jersey Department of Education as being in District Factor Group "CD", the sixth-highest of eight groupings. District Factor Groups organize districts statewide to allow comparison by common socioeconomic characteristics of the local districts. From lowest socioeconomic status to highest, the categories are A, B, CD, DE, FG, GH, I and J.

History
In October 2017, Holly Glen Elementary School was closed for extensive decontamination for a minimum of three weeks, after high levels of mold -- including aspergillus / penicillium and cladosporium -- were discovered in the building. Days later, the district announced that all of its schools would be closed for a minimum of a week to allow for testing in all of the district's facilities of what was described as a "possible mold infestation." Whitehall Elementary School was closed slightly after Holly Glen Elementary School. The former was remediated and students resumed classes on January 2, 2018.

Awards and recognition
Radix Elementary School was honored by the National Blue Ribbon Schools Program in 2019, one of nine schools in the state recognized as Exemplary High Performing Schools.

Schools
Schools in the district (with 2019–20 enrollment data from the National Center for Education Statistics) are:
Elementary schools
Holly Glen Elementary School with 437 students in grades K-4
Karen Pontano-Crossley, Principal
Oak Knoll Elementary School with 529 students in grades K-4
Kristy Baker, Principal
Radix Elementary School with 640 students in grades PreK-4
Dr. Jill DelConte, Principal
Whitehall Elementary School with 311 students in grades K-4
JoAnne E. Rumpf, Principal
Middle school
Williamstown Middle School with 1,867 students in grades 5-8
David Babich, Acting Principal
High school
Williamstown High School with 1,837 students in grades 9-12
Angelo DeStefano, Principal

Administration
Core members of the district's administration are:
Susan Ficke, Superintendent
Lisa Schulz, Business Administrator / Board Secretary

Board of education
The district's board of education, comprised of nine members, sets policy and oversees the fiscal and educational operation of the district through its administration. As a Type II school district, the board's trustees are elected directly by voters to serve three-year terms of office on a staggered basis, with three seats up for election each year held (since 2013) as part of the November general election. The board appoints a superintendent to oversee the district's day-to-day operations and a business administrator to supervise the business functions of the district.

References

External links
Monroe Township Public Schools

School Data for the Monroe Township Public Schools, National Center for Education Statistics

Monroe Township, Gloucester County, New Jersey
New Jersey District Factor Group CD
School districts in Gloucester County, New Jersey